The  basketball tournament at the 1981 Southeast Asian Games took place from 7 to 13 December 1981.  This edition of the tournament featured both men's and women's tournament.  All matches took place at the Rizal Memorial Coliseum in Manila.

The hosts  were able to regain the men's championship title by blasting the defending champions  in the Gold Medal Match, 91–74, to avenge their preliminary loss to the same team. Meanwhile,  edged out  in the third place battle, 99–90, to take home the Bronze Medal.

Tournament format
The competition format for both men's and women's event calls for the top two teams after the single round robin to face in the championship match. The third and fourth-placed teams, on the other hand, will battle for the Bronze Medal.

Men's tournament

Participating nations

Results

Bronze medal match

Gold medal match

Final standings

Women's tournament

Participating nations

Results

Bronze medal match

Gold medal match

Final standings

References

1981
1981 Southeast Asian Games events
1981 in Asian basketball
International basketball competitions hosted by the Philippines